Blankenfelde Manor  is a manor in Vilce Parish, Jelgava Municipality in the historical region of Zemgale, in Latvia. Built at the last quarter of the 17th century, it changed owners several times. The renovation work is currently being processed.

History
The first reports of the manor date from 1689 when the owner was Ernst von Medem. The estate changed owners several times and was part of the von Hahn family from 1840 until 1920. Between 1804 and 1805 the manor was bestowed by the Russian imperial house to Andreas von Königfels, during this time the manor was visited by exiled French King Louis XVIII.

Description
The complex structure of the manor dates from the mid 18th century and the main building erected in 1743 has a 19th-century English-style park with exotic fir trees and multiple small ponds, nowadays also with play and sports grounds. The manor complex features also a restored gatehouse and a stable. 
The manor is distinguished from other Latvian manors by the small architectural forms, such as the entrance gates, tea pavilions, grotto, the only rococo wrought iron garden gate in Latvia.
Nowadays the manor houses a hotel, a small juice plant (using berries grown in manor's garden) and a bell museum. The renovation work of the main building is now underway. Blankenfelde estate flower garden is part of the spring tulbifestivale.

See also
List of palaces and manor houses in Latvia

References

Attribution
This article is based on the translation of the corresponding article of the Estonian Wikipedia. A list of contributors can be found there at the History section.

External links
  Blankenfelde Manor

Manor houses in Latvia
Jelgava Municipality